The Dorrigo Steam Railway & Museum in Dorrigo, New South Wales, Australia is a large, privately owned collection of railway vehicles and equipment from the railways of New South Wales, covering both Government and private railways. The collection dates from 1878 until 1985.

Status
The museum was opened very briefly in 1986, but has been described as "not yet open to the public" ever since.

History
The museum's origins stem from the formation of the Hunter Valley Steam Railway & Museum in 1973 which was formed following the closure of the Glenreagh to Dorrigo branch line the previous year with the aim of restoring the 69 kilometres as a tourist railway. Much of the rolling stock was stored at the former Rhondda Colliery, three kilometres from Cockle Creek while the line was repaired. It was renamed the Dorrigo Steam Railway & Museum in 1982. 

On 20 December 1984, the section from Glenreagh to Lowanna was reopened with 5069 hauling the first train. On 5 April 1986 the line was opened through to Dorrigo, with a steam hauled service hauled by 3028 and 5069, operating the first service over the final 13 kilometres from Megan through to the terminus with 300 members on board. At this stage the line still needed further work before trains could operate on it regularly. This was completed in October 1986.

However, before operations could begin, a faction within the museum's membership commenced legal action over the ownership of the collection and the line fell back into a state of disrepair. The dispute was finally resolved in February 1999 with the Glenreagh to Ulong section of the line sold to the Glenreagh Mountain Railway and the Ulong to Dorrigo section sold to the Dorrigo Steam Railway & Museum. By 2017, it had the largest collection in the world with 75 locomotives, 19 railmotors and 280 carriages and wagons.

Preservation

Other locomotives
42 class diesel locomotive 4206
421 class diesel locomotive 42102
44 class diesel locomotive 4420
45 class diesel locomotive 4521
46 class electric locomotive 4602
47 class diesel locomotive 4706
48 class diesel locomotive 4822
49 class diesel locomotive 4918
70 class diesel hydraulic locomotive 7007, 7008, 7010
73 class diesel hydraulic locomotive 7329, 7335
85 class electric locomotive 8507
86 class electric locomotive 8601, 8650
BHP D9 class diesel locomotive D11

References

External links
Dorrigo Steam Railway & Museum
360 Aerial Panorama
NSWRail.net

Railway museums in New South Wales
Tourist railways in New South Wales
1973 establishments in Australia